Walhalla   is a 1995 Belgian and Dutch thriller film directed by Eddy Terstall.

Cast
Marc van Uchelen	... 	Michel de Feyter
Huub Stapel	... 	Raymond de Feyter
Antje de Boeck	... 	Sanne

See also
1995 in film

External links 
 

1995 films
1990s Dutch-language films
1995 thriller films
Films directed by Eddy Terstall
Dutch thriller drama films
Belgian thriller drama films
Dutch-language Belgian films